Uttarakhand is a state in North India. Its name, which means "northern land" or "section" or "northern part" in Sanskrit, is mentioned in early Hindu texts as the combined region of Kedarkhand and Manaskhand.

In the Puranas, Uttarakhand was the ancient term for the central Indian Himalayas. Its peaks and valleys were known as Svarga loka: a temporary abode of the righteous, and the source of the Ganges. At that time, present-day Uttarakhand was also reportedly inhabited by rishis and sadhus.  Uttarakhand is known as "the land of the gods" (Devbhumi) because of its number of Hindu pilgrimage sites. During the Vedic period, several small republics known as Janapada existed in this region. The Pauravas, Kushanas, Kunindas, Guptas, Katyuris, Palas, Chands, Parmars (or Panwars),  and the British have ruled the state by turns.

Early history

The region was settled by the Kol people, who speak Munda language. They later joined Indo-Aryan tribes who arrived by the Vedic period. At that time, present-day Uttarakhand was also reportedly inhabited by rishis and sadhus. It is believed that the rishi (sage) Vyasa wrote the Mahabharata there, since the Pandavas are believed to have traveled (and camped) in the region. Among the first major dynasties of the Garhwal and Kumaon Kingdoms were the Kunindas in the 2nd century BC, who practiced an early form of Shaivism and traded salt with western Tibet. Garhwal Kito have settled in the northern highlands and elsewhere in the region, are believed to be the ancestors of the present-day Bhotiya, Raji, Buksha, and Tharu peoples.

Kumaon prospered under the Chand kings from the eighth to the 18th centuries, and Pahari painting developed from the 17th to the 19th centuries.[3] Present-day Garhwal was also unified under the Soomra dynasty, who with the Brahmins and Rajputs, arrived from the plains.[4] After the fall of the Katyuri dynasty, the Chand dynasty was established by Som Chand. The Kumaon kingdom was originally limited to an area around its capital, Champawat, later including parts of Nepal and Nainital, Pithoragarh and Almora. Atm Chand succeeded his father, and Indra Chand began silk production. Gyan Chand (1365-1420) defeated the Delhi Sultanate at Terai. Bharati Chand (1437-1477) attacked the Nepalese king and ruled east of the Karnali.

Nepal's expanding Gurkha Empire overran Almora, the seat of the Kumaon Kingdom, in 1791and in 1804 the Garhwal Kingdom also fell to the Gurkhas. With the end of the Anglo-Nepalese War in 1816, the western Garhwal Kingdom was re-established in Tehri; eastern Garhwal and Kumaon were ceded to the British in accordance with the Treaty of Sugauli. Jaunsar-Bawar was part of the Sirmur kingdom, primarily as a buffer between Sirmur and Garhwal. Fateh Shah seized the region and Dehradun from the Sirmur kings, the Jaunsari and the local pahari; Sirmaur-era words are still found in the Jaunsari language. In 1829, Jaunsar-Bawar was incorporated into the Chakrata tehsil; it had been part of the Punjab state of Sirmur until the British conquered it and Dehradun after the 1814 war with the Gurkhas. The region was known as Jaunsar-Bawar before the establishment of a British Indian Army cantonment in 1866, and the name continued in popular use until the early 20th century. Although Western Hindi is popular in most of the neighbouring hill areas, Jaunsari (a Western Pahari language) is spoken by most people in the region.

After independence

After Indian independence, the Tehri princely state was merged into Uttar Pradesh (where Uttarakhand consisted of the Garhwal and Kumaon divisions. Until 1998, Uttarakhand was the name most commonly used to refer to the region as political groups (including the Uttarakhand Kranti Dal, founded in 1979) began advocating statehood under its banner. Although the former hill kingdoms of Garhwal and Kumaon were traditional rivals with diverse linguistic and cultural influences (due to the proximity of different, neighbouring ethnic groups, their shared geography, economy, and traditions created strong bonds between the regions. These bonds were Uttarakhand's new political identity, which gained significant momentum when the demand for statehood in 1994 received near-unanimous acceptance among the local population and national political parties. The 1/2 October 1994 Rampur Tiraha firing case caused an uproar which eventually led to the creation of Uttarakhand from Uttar Pradesh in 2000.

The term Uttaranchal came into use when the Bharatiya Janata Party (BJP)-led central and Uttar Pradesh state governments began a state reorganization in 1998 and introduced their preferred name. The BJP name triggered controversy among separate-state activists, who saw it as a political act. In August 2006, India's Union Cabinet agreed to the four-year-old demand of the Uttaranchal state assembly and Uttarakhand-movement leaders to rename Uttaranchal Uttarakhand. Legislation to that effect was passed by the State Legislative Assembly in October 2006, passed in the winter session of Parliament, and signed into law by the president in December of that year.

Further reading

Mountain Temples and Temple Mountains

References